Bard's Field, or Bard's Field on Trinity Manor, is a historic home located at Ridge, St. Mary's County, Maryland, United States. It was built in the early 19th century.  It is a -story frame house on a brick foundation with double exterior end chimneys. The house is representative of a common, 18th century, Southern Maryland house type.  Formerly operated as a bed and breakfast.

Bard's Field was listed on the National Register of Historic Places in 1976.

References

External links
, including photo from 1999, at Maryland Historical Trust
St. Mary's County Historic Preservation Commission: Bard's Field entry

Houses on the National Register of Historic Places in Maryland
Houses in St. Mary's County, Maryland
Historic American Buildings Survey in Maryland
Bed and breakfasts in Maryland
National Register of Historic Places in St. Mary's County, Maryland